"La Bête à Maît' Belhomme" is a short story by French author Guy de Maupassant, published in 1885.

History
La Bête à Maît' Belhomme is a short story written by Guy de Maupassant. It was first published in the newspaper Gil Blas on September 22, 1885, before being reprised in the Monsieur Parent collection.

Synopsis
When one is a Norman peasant, it is an adventure to go to town by stagecoach.

That day, in the Le Havre stagecoach, there is the schoolmaster, the priest, Maître Rabot, Maître Caniveau and Maître Belhomme, a tall skinny man who moans while putting a handkerchief on his ear.

Soon, his travel companions will learn that Belhomme is convinced that a beast has entered through his ear and is eating his brain. The trip will be poisoned by this old whiner who makes more and more horrible cries.

But what is this mysterious beast that is gnawing at poor Belhomme, and how will their trip end?

Publications
 Gil Blas, 1885
 Monsieur Parent - collection published in 1885 by the editor Paul Ollendorff
 Maupassant, contes et nouvelles, volume II, text established and annotated by Louis Forestier, Bibliothèque de la Pléiade, Éditions Gallimard, 1979

References

External Links 

 

1885 short stories
Short stories by Guy de Maupassant
Works originally published in Gil Blas (periodical)